Boycott is a 1930 German drama film directed by Robert Land and starring Ernst Stahl-Nachbaur, Lil Dagover, and Rolf von Goth.

The film's sets were designed by the art director Ludwig Reiber. It was shot at the Emelka Studios in Munich.

Plot 
At an elite high school in Berlin in the early 1930s: all of the high school seniors, who all came from higher circles, adhere to a conservative concept of morality and honor. When the building contractor Haller is accused of fraud, the class boycotts his son Erich, much to the dismay of the class teacher, Dr. Herman. Only Erich's classmate Möller and his sister Grete stick by him. His classmate Herbert von Pahl told Erich that he would take his own life in the same situation. Dr Hermann makes it clear that nobody is responsible for the actions of others, only for one's own actions. He unequivocally expresses that he does not consider suicide to be a sign of strength and heroism, but rather weakness and cowardice.

The insecure Erich tries to gain clarity, but he reaps scorn and cynicism. Although his disillusioned stepmother worries about Erich, she has long since turned her back on his father and is leaving the family by eloping with an admirer. When it turns out that von Pahl's father is also involved in the affair, Herbert puts his announcement into action. The shaken Erich is plagued by self-doubt and wanders aimlessly through Berlin. Disturbed by his disappearance, Dr. Hermann and his classmates in Treptower Park after him. In the meantime, he visits his father, who is now in custody. He mocks Erich and confesses that it would have been best if he had never married and, above all, never had children. Erich realizes that he has nothing in common with his father and looks for Dr. Hermann in his apartment. The next morning, Erich and Dr. Hermann enters the classroom and is enthusiastically received by his classmates.

Cast

References

Bibliography

External links 
 

1930 films
Films of the Weimar Republic
German drama films
1930 drama films
1930s German-language films
Films directed by Robert Land
Bavaria Film films
Films shot at Bavaria Studios
German black-and-white films
1930s German films